Draba pterosperma is an uncommon species of flowering plant in the family Brassicaceae known by the common name wingedseed draba. It is endemic to Siskiyou County, California, where it is known only from the Marble and Salmon Mountains of the Klamath Range. It is a small perennial herb forming dense mats or cushions of hairy, oval-shaped leaves each no more than a centimeter long. The erect inflorescence bears several white flowers that yield flat oval-shaped siliques containing winged seeds.

External links
Jepson Manual Treatment
USDA Plants Profile
Photo gallery

pterosperma
Endemic flora of California
Natural history of Siskiyou County, California
Flora without expected TNC conservation status